Alvin Head Moore (April 20, 1838 – February 20, 1911) was a Canadian politician.

Born in Hatley, Stanstead County, Lower Canada, the son of American born United Empire Loyalists, Moore was president of the Waterloo and Magog Railway. He was Mayor of the Township and Town of Magog and Warden of the County of Stanstead. He was elected to the House of Commons of Canada for the Quebec electoral district of Stanstead in the general elections of 1896. A Conservative, he was defeated in 1900 and 1908.

Electoral record

References
 
 Personnel of the Senate and House of Commons, eighth Parliament of Canada, elected June 23, 1896

1838 births
1911 deaths
Conservative Party of Canada (1867–1942) MPs
Mayors of places in Quebec
Members of the House of Commons of Canada from Quebec